Neubert is a surname. Notable people with the surname include:

Blake Paul Neubert (born 1981), American painter, illustrator and writer now based in Fort Collins, Colorado
Julie Neubert, British actress who is perhaps best known for playing the ill-fated Wendy in the first series of Survivors in 1975
Keith Neubert (born 1964), professional American football tight end in the National Football League
Klaus-Dieter Neubert (born 1949), German rower who competed for East Germany in the 1968 and 1972 Summer Olympics
Michael Neubert (1933–2014), Conservative MP for Romford from 1974 until 1997
Ramona Neubert (born 1958), former heptathlete from East Germany
Rudolf Neubert (1914–1995), highly decorated Oberstleutnant in the Wehrmacht during World War II and an Oberst in the Bundeswehr
Thomas Neubert (born 1980), German footballer

German-language surnames
Occupational surnames